The 1997 Campeonato Paulista de Futebol Profissional da Primeira Divisão - Série A1 was the 96th season of São Paulo's top professional football league. Corinthians won the championship by the 22nd time. América and Botafogo were relegated.

Championship

First phase
In the first phase, the sixteen teams of the championship were divided into two groups of eight, with each team playing once against the teams of its own group and twice against the other group's teams. The two best teams of each group qualified into the Final Group and the two teams with the fewest points out of the sixteen were relegated.

Group 1

Group 2

Final Playoffs

References

Campeonato Paulista seasons
Paulista